{{DISPLAYTITLE:NZR LA class }}

The NZR LA class was a class of  steam locomotives used by the New Zealand Railways Department and the New Zealand Midland Railway Company. They were built by Nasmyth, Wilson and Company in 1887 for New Zealand Midland Railway Company, and were taken over by NZR in 1900, when the government acquired the incomplete Midland line. The designation also applies to the NZR rebuilds of the Avonside L class of 1875 which were later reclassified LB after being rebuilt as s.

Midland LA class
The New Zealand Midland Railway Company ordered five  locomotives from Nasmyth Wilson in 1887 for use on their planned railway between Nelson, Greymouth and Christchurch. These locomotives were built to a standard Nasmyth Wilson design for export, and had double-skinned cab roofs for work in tropical climates. The first three locomotives were named Reefton, Christchurch and Nelson on entry into service; the other two locomotives never carried names.

The locomotives, numbered as NZMRC NO's 1–5, were responsible for running all trains over the Midland Railway between Reefton, Stillwater and Lake Brunner, as well as running NZMRC trains over the NZR line between Stillwater and Greymouth. Following the failure of the NZMRC and its takeover by the NZR, the locomotives were renumbered as LA 310–315. Now based at Greymouth, the engines remained in service until the first withdrawal began in 1920.

Withdrawal
The first Midland LA to be withdrawn was LA 311 (formerly NZMRC NO 2) in March 1920. The remaining locomotives were withdrawn between 1924 and 1928. Two of the withdrawn locomotives were sold for industrial service; LA 311 was sold to the Auckland Farmers Freezing Company in 1920 and worked as a shunting locomotive at their Moerewa works between 1920 and 1934, while LA 314 was sold to the New Forest Sawmilling Company at Ngahere where it worked as the mill's yard engine transferring wagons between the NZR station and the sawmill between 1926 and 1950.

The remaining locomotives, LA's 310, 312 and 313, were written off but not scrapped. Instead, at least one, LA 312, was dumped at the Omoto locomotive dump in 1929. The remains of LA 312 were salvaged for preservation in 2006 and are now in storage pending restoration to working order.

Rebuilds

In 1893–94, NZR decided to rebuild three Avonside L class  locomotives as  locomotives. The conversion, classified by the NZR as the LA class, did not address the limited fuel capacity, and all further rebuilds were rebuilt as s.

See also
 NZR F class
 NZR FA / FB
 NZR G class (1874)
 NZR L class
 Locomotives of New Zealand

References

Citations

Bibliography

External links
 NZR La class

La class
4-4-0T locomotives
Nasmyth, Wilson and Company locomotives
Avonside locomotives
3 ft 6 in gauge locomotives of New Zealand
Railway locomotives introduced in 1887